The Hole may refer to:

Arts, entertainment, and media

Films
 The Hole (1957 film), a Japanese drama directed by Kon Ichikawa
 The Hole (1960 film), a French film directed by Jacques Becker
 The Hole (1962 film), an animated short film directed by John Hubley
 The Hole (1997 film), a South Korean thriller directed by Kim Sung-hong
 The Hole (1998 film), a Taiwanese drama directed by Tsai Ming-Liang
 The Hole (2001 film), a British thriller directed by Nick Hamm
 The Hole (2009 film), a 3D film directed by Joe Dante
 The Hole (2010 film), a documentary set in New York City
 The Hole, two short 2016 documentaries on the Montreal Protocol, see David Attenborough filmography#2010s 
 The Hole (2020 film), El hoyo, a Spanish-language film released in English-language regions as The Platform.
 The Hole (2021 film), an Italian film directed by Michelangelo Frammartino

Music
 The Hole (album), a 1986 album by Golden Earring
 "The Hole" (I Am Weasel), a 1998 episode of I Am Weasel
 "The Hole" (song), a 1998 song by Randy Travis

Other uses in arts, entertainment, and media
 The Hole (play), a 1958 absurdist play
The Hole (novel), a 2014 Japanese novel written by Hiroko Oyamada.
 "Back in the Hole", a season 4 episode of The Shield

Places
 The Hole (lake), a small glacial lake in Elmore County, Idaho
 The Hole (Scientology), a detention facility  operated by the Church of Scientology
 The Hole, New York City, a neighborhood within New York City
 The Hole, a colloquial name for the Underground Complex at Canadian Forces Base North Bay, Canada

Other uses
 The hole, a colloquial term for solitary confinement

See also 
 Hole (disambiguation)